mimalloc (pronounced "me-malloc") is a free and open-source compact general-purpose memory allocator developed by Microsoft with focus on performance characteristics. The library is about 11000 lines of code and works as a drop-in replacement for malloc of the C standard library and requires no additional code changes. mimalloc was initially developed for the run-time systems of the Lean and Koka languages. Notable design aspects include free list sharding, eager page reset, first-class heaps. It can co-exist with other memory allocators linked to the same program.
mimalloc is available on Windows, Mac OS X, Linux and *BSD. The source code is licensed under MIT License and available on GitHub.

See also

C dynamic memory allocation
Manual memory management
Dynamic memory allocation
Hoard memory allocator

References

Further reading

External links
 GitHub - microsoft/mimalloc
 Reviewing mimalloc: Part I - Ayende @ Rahien
 Reviewing mimalloc: Part II - Ayende @ Rahien

Free and open-source software
Memory management software
Microsoft development tools
Microsoft free software
Software using the MIT license
2019 software